Olivia Sanchez (born 17 November 1982) is a retired French tennis player. Her paternal grandparents are Spanish.

On 9 June 2008, she reached her best singles ranking of world No. 90. On 6 December 2010, she peaked at No. 427 in the doubles rankings.
In her career, Sanchez won 12 singles titles and one doubles title on the ITF Women's Circuit. 

She was coached by Norbert Palmier.

Tennis career

2007
In May, she received a wildcard into the main draw of the French Open, but lost to American Shenay Perry in the first round, in three sets.

She reached five ITF singles finals, winning four (in Spain, Portugal, France and Mexico). Sanchez won her first $75k tournament in September 2007 at the Open Engie Porte du Hainaut, defeating Anastasiya Yakimova in the final.

2008
At the Australian Open, she defeated Zuzana Ondrášková and Yuliya Beygelzimer, but then lost to Alisa Kleybanova in the final round of qualifying, in straight sets.

In February, she made her WTA Tour main-draw debut at the Abierto Mexicano. She won in the first round against Martina Müller, but lost 1–6, 5–7 to Sorana Cîrstea in the second.

She received a wildcard into the main draw of the French Open but then lost 2–6, 6–7 to Karin Knapp. As of 9 June 2008, Sanchez reached her highest singles ranking of world No. 90.

2010
She received a wildcard entry into the main draw of the French Open, but lost 5–7, 2–6 against Marion Bartoli in the second round.

She reached five singles finals on the ITF Circuit, winning four (in the United States, Brazil, Spain and France).

Sanchez declared her retirement from professional tennis in 2012.

ITF finals

Singles (12–10)

Doubles (1–0)

References

External links

 
 

1982 births
Living people
French female tennis players
French people of Spanish descent
Tennis players from Paris